Heuliez Bus is a French limited company, former part of the Henri Heuliez Group. It was formed in 1980. It is an Iveco Group brand and is specialized in manufacturing buses and coaches.

History 
Heuliez Bus has developed many types of public transport vehicles and gained the recognition of Mercedes-Benz O305 (rigid) and O305 G (articulated) with other front and rear, badged as Heuliez. Around 600 of each type operated in France between 1975 and 1995.

In 1982 the company started to build the GX 17, a minibus based on the Renault Master. After that, in the 1980s, collaborated with Renault Bus to develop the GX 107 and GX 187 and built the GX 44, for the public transport authority of Nantes, which is based on an O305; and the GX 113, specifically for the city of Marseille.

In the 1980s, Heuliez Bus and Renault developed the "Mégabus" (officially the Heuliez GX237) which was a bi-articulated high-floor bus based on the Renault PR180.2. Ten of these buses were built in 1989 for Bordeaux which was used until the tram system opened in 2004.

In 1990 Heuliez Bus made the GX 77H midibus (The H standing for Heuliez), and in 1994, the low-floor bus GX 317, built on a Renault chassis. From 1995 to 2001, its collaboration with Volvo led to the design and production of the GX 217 and GX 417.

The GX 117 midibus, the successor to the 77H, was launched in 1999. As of 2012, with significant restyling, this is sold as the GX 327. GX 127 and GX 127L are at the planning stage.

The newest product, designed for Clermont-Ferrand, is the GX 427. Although its CNG version was turned down, it is the twin, articulated version of the Irisbus Citelis 18.

In France, buses produced by the company have the marques "Heuliez Bus"; elsewhere they are known as "Irisbus". The company manufactured  buses between 1985 and 2006.

Amongst other things, since 2002 Heuliez Bus has manufactured the Irisbus Civis and Irisbus Cristalis on behalf of the Bus business unit of Iveco Bus.

In 2008 the company had revenue of €118.1m, employing around 450 employees at its factory in Rorthais.

Gallery

Notes and references

External links
 Official website
Heuliez - official web site
Heuliez-Mia - official web site
Paris 2008: Heuliez Friendly

Iveco
Bus manufacturers of France
Coachbuilders of France